The following is a complete list of books and other writings by Colin Thiele, the prolific Australian children's writer.

Children's books

Ab Diver, 1988
Aftershock, The sequel to Shatterbelt, 1992
Albatross Two,  1974
The Australian ABC, 1992
The Australian Mother Goose, 1992
The Australian Mother Goose II, 1994
Ballander Boy, 1979
Billy Bilby's Barbecue, 2005
Blue Fin, 1969
Brahminy: The Story of a Boy and a Sea Eagle, 1995
The Cave & The Glory of a Galumph, 1989
Chadwick's Chimney, 1979
Charlie Vet's Pet, 1992
Coorong Captive, 1985
Dad Drains The Oil, 1988
Dangerous Secret, 1997
Danny's Egg, 1989
Emma Keppler: Two Months In Her Life, 1991
Farmer Pelz's Pumpkins, 1990
Farmer Schulz's Ducks, 1986
February Dragon, 1966
The Fire In The Stone, 1973
Flash Flood, 1970
Flip-Flop and Tiger Snake, 1970
Gemma's Christmas Eve, 1994
Gloop: The Bunyip, 1962
Gloop the Gloomy Bunyip, 1970
The Hammerhead Light, 1976
High Valley Montville, 1996
Jodie's Journey, 1988
Klontarf, 1988
Landslide, 1997
Little Tom Little, 1981
Magpie Island, 1974
The March of Mother Duck, 1993
Martin's Mountain, 1993
Miss Bilby", 2007The Monster Fish, 1999Mr Dumby's Ducks", 2006
Mrs Munch and Puffing Billy, 1967
The Mystery of the Black Pyramid, 1996
Pannikin and Pinta, 2000
Patch Comes Home, 1982
Pinquo, 1983
Pitch The Pony, 1984
Potch Goes Down The Drain, 1984
The Rim of the Morning: Six Stories, 1966
River Murray Mary, 1979
Rotten Egg, & Paterson To The Rescue, 1989
The Sea Caves, 2000.
Seashores and Shadows, 1985.
The Shadow on the Hills, 1977
Shadow Shark, 1985
Sharks in the Shadows, 1985
Shatterbelt, 1987
The Sknuks, 1977
Speedy, 1991
Stories Short and Tall, 1989
Storm Boy, 1963
The Sun on the Stubble, 1961
Sun Warm Memories: The Colin Thiele Reciter, 2003
Swan Song, 2002
Tanya and Trixie, 1980
Thiele Tales: Three Long Stories for Children, 1980
Timmy, 1993
Uncle Gustav's Ghosts, 1974
The Undercover Secret, 1982
The Valley Between, 1981
Wedgetail, 2003
Wendy's Whale, 1999
Yellow Jacket Jock, 1969

Fiction
Labourers in the Vineyard, 1970
The Seeds' Inheritance, 1986

Short Story
The Ghost of Gartenschmuck, from A Handful of Ghosts: Thirteen Eerie Tales by Australian authors; collected by Barbara Ker Wilson. 1976

Educational
Australian Poets Speak; Edited by Colin Thiele and Ian Mudie. 1961
Beginners, Please! One-Act Plays for Schools; Compiled by Colin Thiele and Greg Branson. 1964
Blue Fin, Educational Companion. 1978
The Book and the Media, 1976
Favourite Australian Stories; Compiled by Colin Thiele. 1963
Handbook to Favourite Australian Stories; Compiled by Colin Thiele. 1964
The Living Stage: One-Act Plays for Secondary Schools: Book 2; Edited by Colin Thiele and Greg Branson. 1970
Looking at Poetry; Edited by Colin Thiele. 1960
One-Act Plays for Secondary Schools: Book 3; Compiled by Colin Thiele and Greg Branson.
Plays for Young Players; Compiled by Colin Thiele and Greg Branson. 1970
Setting the Stage: One-Act Plays for Secondary Schools: Book 1; Edited by Colin Thiele and Greg Branson. 1969
The State of our State: Peeping At South Australia, Adelaide, 1952
Storm Boy, Educational Companion. 1976

Verse and Prose

The Golden Lightning: Poems,  1950
In Charcoal and Conte, 1966
Jindyworobak Anthology, 1953
Man in a Landscape, 1960
Poems in my Luggage, 1989
Progress to Denial: A Poem, 1945
Reckless Rhymes, 1994
Selected Verse, 1970
Songs for my Thongs, 1982
Splinters and Shards: Poems, 1945
Tea for Three, by Max Fatchen and Colin Thiele. 1994

General Literature

The Adelaide Story, 1982
Barossa Valley Sketchbook, 1968
The Benedictions of Benjamin Gates, by Arthur Burfield and Colin Thiele. 1977
The Best of Colin Thiele, 1980
The Bight, 1976
Coorong, 1972
Coorong, 1986
The Coorong, 1997
Grains of Mustard Seed, with research by Ron Gibbs. 1975
Masterpieces, 1977
Heysen of Hahndorf, 1968
Heysen's Early Hahndorf, The Early Works of Sir Hans Heysen. 1976
Lincoln's Place: The Story of an Australian Pioneer Farm, 1978
The Little Desert, 1975
Maneater Man: Alf Dean, The World's Greatest Shark Hunter, 1979
Passing Glances and Glancing Passes: The Role of Teachers Centres, 1977
Range Without Man: The North Flinders, 1974
Ranger's Territory: The Story of Frank Woerle, as told to Colin Thiele. 1987
Some Ideas For Conference Organisers, by Ron O'Hare and Colin Thiele. 1977
Something To Crow About: A Keyhole Glimpse of South Australia, 1986
South Australia Revisited, 1986
With Dew On My Boots: A Childhood Revisited, 1997

Videos

Cigarettes and Matches, from Sun on the Stubble. 1979
The Fire In The Stone
Storm Boy, SAFC. 1976
Sun on the Stubble, 1996

Spoken Word Recordings

Anna, from 5UV. 27 August 1984
Ballander Boy
Burke and Wills, AFoA. 1960
Colin Thiele Travelogue, 1977
Emma Keppler, 1993
Farmer Schulz's Ducks, 1987
Final Assembly of Wattle Park Teachers College, 1972
In Charcoal & Conte:, Series: Poets Tongue, 1966
Introducing Blue Fin, 1978
Look to the Future, 1992
Magpie Island, 1995
Pitch the Pony
Potch Goes Down The Drain
Public Reading of Poetry and Prose, 1977
The Seed's Inheritance, 1988
The Shadow on the Hills, from ABC. 26 September 1979
The Shark Fishers, from ABC
The Sknuks, 1987
Snook Takes A Dip?, Adapted from the novel Blue Fin
Speedy, 1992
Stories Short and Tall, 1990
Storm Boy: A Dramatisation, 1994
The Sun on the Stubble, from ABC. 1995
Talking & Reading, 1980
Tigersnook, Based on Blue Fin, 1979
The Tuna That Fell Off A Truck, 1979
The Undercover Secret, from ABC. 1996
Winners! 2, from ABC. 1998
With Dew On My Boots, from ABC Audio. 1997

Articles and Miscellanea
The articles here are writings with portions, though not the entire work necessarily, attributed to Colin Thiele.

Kapunda Memories
Hearts & Minds: Creative Australians and the Environment, with M Pollak and M MacNabb., 2000
 D.B. Kerr and P.G. Pfeiffer's, Lost Angry Penguins, 2000
ReSearch98: Spotlight On Research In Education, 1998
Believe In Yourself: Who'd Want To Be A Writer?, 1996
Big Rig, in Big Rig and Other Poems, 1995
A Special Place In A Writer's World, 1992
Meet Colin Thiele, 1992
Dragnet, in After Dark: Seven Tales To Read At Night, 1992
Happy Birthday Rippa, 1991
Hi, I've Got Brown Eyes, from Classroom: The Magazine For Teachers, 1990
The Kindest Cut: Arthritis Snd Surgery, 1990
Behind Books, from The Spirit Of Place, 1990
Change and Short Change, 1990
The Candle and the Star, 1988
Foreword in Peter Killey's, My Word - My World, 1986
Society Expects Too Much Of Education, David Tonkin interviews Colin Thiele. 1985
A Child's Christmas, from SAM: South Australian Magazine. 1983
Inside story: Profiles in children's literature, 1983
Contributions to, Unlimited Scope, 1983
Foreword in, An Australian Bush Who's Who: Verses and Illustrations, 1983
Colin Thiele Opinion: The Journal of S.A.E.T.A., September 1982
Origins and Odysseys: Writers' Childhood Influences, July 1982
The Part-time Writer: The Agony and the Ecstasy, May 1980
Childhood and Change, November 1980
Sunrise and Starshine: A Boyhood Revisited, in The Early Dreaming: Australian Children's Authors on Childhood, 1980
Foreword from, South Australian Parks and Conservation, November 1979
The Bathers Opinion: The Journal of S.A.E.T.A., March 1979
A World of Living Books, 1978
Foreword from, Our magazine: The Writers Club of the Helping Hand, 1977
Shall we make a film of your book?, 1976
Roll on Port Lincoln, 1973
The Dragon's Rampage, from The Too-Many Professors and Other Stories, 1973
A Farewell to Wattle Park, 1972
The Quality of Experience, May 1972
Things Books Grow From, or Why Books Germinate, and How They Are Affected By The Climate and The Gardner, August 1970
The Educator at the Party, November 1969
No Man Bathes Twice In The Same River, August 1968
Grass Roots and Far Horizons, 1967
Four poems, for ASEA Bulletin, October 1967
Wintering
Eclipse
Radiation Victim
Shall Such A Love
Creative English in Primary Schools, November 1967
Storm Boy from Woman's Day, March 1965
Lady Franklin in South Australia Tradition, April 1964
Lutheran Landing, Port Misery, 1838, November 1963
Flying the Bight, November 1962
Dark Room, November 1962
School Hymn, for Seacombe High School, 1962
The Secondary School Teacher, May 1958
Two Homecomers, November 1943

References
 Sourced from Library of University of South Australia

Thiele, Colin
Bibliographies of Australian writers
Children's literature bibliographies